The Harmonia Macrocosmica is a star atlas written by Andreas Cellarius and published in 1660 by Johannes Janssonius. The first part of the atlas contains copper plate prints depicting the world systems of Claudius Ptolemy, Nicolaus Copernicus, and Tycho Brahe. At the end are star maps of the classical and further constellations, the latter ones as introduced by Julius Schiller in his Coelum stellatum christianum of 1627.

For its importance in the history of celestial cartography, the Harmonia Macrocosmica is considered one of the notable masterworks from the Golden Age of Dutch/Netherlandish cartography ( 1570s–1670s), along with Abraham Ortelius's Theatrum Orbis Terrarum and Johannes Blaeu's Atlas Maior. It is often described as the most beautiful celestial atlas ever published.

History 
In the foreword to his Chronologica, Gerard Mercator stated the intention to publish an atlas which would cover everything of the then-known cosmos, geography and history of the earth. During his life, Mercator published five volumes of his atlas, the last one being published by his son Rumold. After Mercator's death, the Amsterdam cartographer Johannes Janssonius took over the project. 
He and fellow-cartographer Hendricus Hondius published their Novus Atlas in 1636, which featured over 320 maps in four languages. In 1660, Andreas Cellarius' Harmonia Macrocosmica was published as the seventh volume of the project. With the final addition of a volume describing the cities of the world from 1657, the project was finally completed.

Origins of the engravings 
Of the various engravers and authors who worked on the plates of the atlas, only two have signed their work. The frontispiece of the atlas was created by Frederik Hendrik van den Hove and ten other plates were engraved by Johannes van Loon. Moreover, all the designs of the classical constellations were taken from the ones created by Jan Pieterszoon Saenredam.

References 
Van Gent, Robert H. (2006), Andreas Cellarius, Harmonia Macrocosmica of 1660, TASCHEN, 
 Bio-bibliography of Andreas Cellarius

External links 

 rarebookroom.org
 Harmonia Macrocosmica
Digitized example of the 1661 Harmonia Macrocosmica at RareMaps.com

17th-century Dutch books
Astronomy books
Classical star atlases
Dutch celestial cartography in the Age of Discovery
Astronomy in the Dutch Republic